

Friedrich Kless (7 October 1906 – 6 April 1994) was a German general during World War II. He was a recipient of the Knight's Cross of the Iron Cross.

Awards and decorations

 Knight's Cross of the Iron Cross on 14 October 1940 as Major and Gruppenkommandeur of the II./Kampfgeschwader 55
 German Cross in Gold on 12 January 1943 as Oberstleutnant im Generalstab (in the General Staff) of Luftwaffen-Kommando Ost

References

Citations

Bibliography

 

1906 births
1990 deaths
People from Bayreuth
People from the Kingdom of Bavaria
Luftwaffe World War II generals
Recipients of the Gold German Cross
Recipients of the Knight's Cross of the Iron Cross
German prisoners of war in World War II
Reichswehr personnel
German World War II pilots
Major generals of the Luftwaffe
Military personnel from Bavaria